This is a list of noted Pakistani poets, poets born or raised in Pakistan, whether living there or overseas, and writing in one of the languages of Pakistan.

A

B

Baqi Siddiqui
Bushra Farrukh

D

 Daud Kamal
 Dilawar Figar

E
 Ehsan Danish

F

Faiz Ahmad Faiz
Fouzia Bhatti
Fayyaz Hashmi

G

Ghani Khan
Ghulam Muhammad Qasir
Mir Gul Khan Naseer

H

I

Ibn-e-Insha
Idris Azad
Iftikhar Arif

J

Jon Elia
Jamiluddin Aali
Janbaz Mirza
Josh Malihabadi
Jazib Qureshi
Jamal Ehsani

K

Khaqan Haider Ghazi
Khawar Rizvi
Khurshid Rizvi
Khushal Khan Khattak
Khwaja Ghulam Farid
Kishwar Naheed
Khalid Irfan
Khawaja Pervez

L
Liaquat Ali Asim
Lala Sehrai

M

N

Naeem Hashmi
Nasim Amrohi
Nasir Kazmi
Nazim Panipati
Noon Meem Rashid

O

 Obaidullah Aleem

P

Professor Iqbal Azeem
Parveen Shakir
Pirzada Qasim

Q

Qateel Shifai
Quaim Amrohi

R

Rahman Baba
Rais Amrohvi
 Raees Warsi
 Raushan Yazdani

S

T

Tabish Dehlvi
Tahir Hanfi

U 

 Ustad Bukhari

W

Wasif Ali Wasif
Wazir Agha

Y

Yasmeen Hameed

Z

 Zaheen Shah Taji
 Zamir Jafri
 Zehra Nigah

See also

 List of Pakistani writers
 List of Urdu-language poets

Lists of poets by nationality
Pakistani poets
Poets